The Communist Archio-Marxist Party of Greece (KAKE)—which during varying periods also operated under the names Archio-Marxist Party of Greece and Archio-Marxist Socialist Party of Greece (alternate spellings such as Archeio-Marxist and Archaeo-Marxist exist as well, in addition to a number of other variants)—was a communist political party in Greece, active between 1934 and 1951. It belonged to a subgenre of Marxism–Leninism and Trotskyism known as Archeio-Marxism (Archive-Marxism), and appears to have been the last scion of that ideology, the sole Archio-Marxist remnant of the 1950s.

Dimitris Giotopoulos (Δημήτρης Γιωτόπουλος), often known by his primary alias "Witte", was the leader of KAKE. Before its formation, he had been a leader of the Greek Archio-Marxists, which had been one of the by far largest dissident communist movements in Greece during the early-to-mid-1930s, as members of Leon Trotsky's "Left Opposition". KAKE split from Trotsky's movement in 1934 after significant ideological fallout.

It eventually joined the International Revolutionary Marxist Centre, known as the "London Bureau". The party participated in the 1936 Greek legislative election, with Har. Alexopoulos (Χαρ. Αλεξόπουλος) as its formal party leader, where it won 1,148 votes – roughly 0.1% of the vote. It failed to enter parliament. KAKE survived the dictatorship of General Ioannis Metaxas from 1936 onwards, although Giatopoulos, accused by Trotsky of manifesting "the worst principles of individualism and anarchism", ended up as a refugee abroad, for some time participating in the Spanish Civil War. During World War II and the later the Greek Civil War, KAKE feuded with the Communist Party of Greece (KKE) on matters of policy and theory. Many KAKE members were purged and executed by the Greek People's Liberation Army. It increasingly began to collaborate with the right-wing as a result, allying with the forces of anti-communism.

Its final activities came with the 1951 Greek legislative election, where it received likewise negative results as back in 1936, after which it promptly dissolved. After his return from French exile in the 1950s, the long-time leader Dimitris Giotopoulos became a collaborator of the right-wing regime, cooperating in anti-communist activities. His son Alexandros Giotopoulos, disillusioned with his father's anti-communism, became a notorious left-wing terrorist, active as an armed militant in the ranks of the 17 November terrorist group between 1969 and 2002.

See also

References

1934 establishments in Greece
1940s in Greek politics
1950s in Greek politics
1951 disestablishments in Greece
Defunct communist parties in Greece
International Revolutionary Marxist Centre
Political parties disestablished in 1951
Political parties established in 1934
Trotskyist organizations in Greece